Big Baller may refer to:

Big Baller Brand, a sports apparel company
LaVar Ball, the founder of said company, who goes by that nickname
Big Baller (album), a 1995 hip-hop album by MC Breed